Sermon of Zaynab bint Ali in the court of Yazid  are the statements made by Zaynab bint Ali in the presence of Yazid I in the aftermath of the Battle of Karbala when the captive family members of Muhammad, prophet of Islam, and the heads of those murdered were moved to the Levant (equivalent to the historical region of Syria) by the forces of YazidI. Zaynab delivered a defiant sermon in the court of Yazid in which she humiliated Yazid and exposed his army's atrocities while honoring the Ahl al-Bayt and those killed in Karbala and expounding upon the eternal consequences of the battle.

Zaynab bint Ali

Zaynab bint Ali was one of the daughters of Ali and Fatimah. Like other members of her family she became a great figure of sacrifice, strength, and piety in Islamin both the Sunni and Shia sects of the religion. Zaynab married Abdullah ibn Ja'far and had three sons and two daughters. When her brother Husayn defended Islam and opposed the tyranny of Yazid caliph in 680AD (61AH), Zaynab accompanied his companions, 72 men who, together with Husayn, were brutally slain by government forces numbering 30,000 men at the Battle of Karbala. Zaynab played an important role in disclosing the true events leading up to the massacre of the third Shia Imam Husayn, and his supporters. She also protected the life of her nephew Ali ibn Husayn Zayn al-Abidin, the fourth Shia Imam, as he lay seriously ill and unable to go to the battlefield. Because of her sacrifice and heroism, she became known as the "Hero of Karbala". Zaynab died in 681, and her shrine is located in Damascus, Syria.

Background
After the battle of Karbala the captured family of the prophet and the heads of those who were killed were taken to the Levant by the forces of Yazid. On the first day of the month of Safar, according to Turabi, they arrived in the Levant and the captured family and heads were taken into Yazid's presence. First, the identity of each head was told to him. Then he paid attention to a woman who was objecting. Yazid asked, "Who is this arrogant woman?" All the audience paused for a moment. The woman rose to answer and said: "Why are you asking them [the woman]? Ask me. I'll tell you [who I am]. I am Muhammad's granddaughter. I am Fatima's daughter." People at the court were impressed and amazed by her. 
 
According to the narration of Al-Shaykh Al-Mufid, in Yazid's presence a man with red skin asked Yazid for one of the captured women to be his slave. Yazid hit the lips and teeth of Hussein with his stick while saying: "I wish those of my clan who were killed at Badr, and those who had seen the Khazraj clan wailing (in the battle of Uhad) on account of lancet wounds, were here. At this time, Zaynab bint Ali began to give her sermon.

Context

Zaynab bint Ali started her sermon with the praise of Allah:

God gives time to disbelievers
Verse 178 of chapter of Al Imran was descended about polytheists of Mecca such as Abu Sufyan ibn Harb. Zainab bint Ali once again relates this verse to Yazid, grandson of Abu Sufyan ibn Harb. She said: "Do not be satisfied with this temporal achievement; this time passes quickly and Allah will punish you. You will be humiliated."

As we see in the sermon:

Humiliate the enemy and honoring the Ahl al-Bayt 
One concern of Zaynab bint Ali in the battle of Karbala was the humiliation of the enemy and the honor of the Ahl al-Bayt.

Position of those killed in Karbala 
Zaynab bint Ali told Yazid not to be happy because of his victory. She named verse 169 of AlImran and emphasized that those dying for a just cause are victors and that Yazid's happiness will end with the torture of Allah.

Referring to the oppression
At this point in the sermon she referred to all the oppression and injustices of the Umayyad from time of Abu Sufyan till the time of Yazid ibn Muawiyah. She also believed that the Umayyad owed their power to the Islamic Ummah's failure to uphold the Quran and the rightful succession to Muhammad. She further stated that:

External consequences of the battle
Zaynab bint Ali stated that the battle of Karbala had a positive effect on history. She believed that jihad, struggle in the path of Allah, had eternal effects.

In the News
In his book, Explanations on Sermon of Zaynab bint Ali at the Levant, published by Bustan publications, Ali Karimi Jahromi reviews different opinions about this sermon.

See also
 Battle of Karbala
 Sermon of Ali ibn Husayn in Damascus

References

External links
 Full text of sermon of zaynab bint Ali in Yazid presence

Battle of Karbala
Shia Islam